Julian "Dooley" Kean Roosevelt (November 14, 1924 – March 27, 1986) was an American banker and Olympic yachtsman who was a member of the Roosevelt family.

Early life
Roosevelt was born on November 14, 1924 to George Emlen Roosevelt and Julia Morris Addison, the sister of James Thayer Addison.  Through his father he was a first cousin twice removed of U.S. President Theodore Roosevelt.  Roosevelt attended Philips Exeter (1943) and later, Harvard University, where he participated in crew.

Career
From 1942 to 1946, he served in the United States Coast Guard, and was discharged from the Army Reserve Field Artillery in 1955 after 8 years of active reserve duty.

He participated in the 1948 Olympics and became a gold medalist in the 1952 Olympics in the 6-meter class,  he was later a member of the International Olympic Committee who advocated removing political motives from the games, criticizing the U.S. boycott of the 1980 Moscow Olympics and the banning of South African athletes.

After the Olympics, he became a partner of Dick & Merle Smith, an investment brokerage firm in New York City that was created as part of the break-up of Roosevelt & Son due to the passage of the Glass–Steagall Act in 1934.  He also served as a trustee of the Union Square Savings Bank and was a director of Fundamental Investors, Inc., also in New York.  He later served as a vice president of Sterling Grace & Company.

Personal life
He was twice married, first in 1946 in Providence, Rhode Island, to Florence Madeleine Graham (d. 1991), the daughter of E. W. Sterling Graham of Pittsburgh, and was descended from William Bradford, the 2nd Governor of Plymouth Colony.  Before their divorce in 1955, they had three children together:

 Nicholas Paul Roosevelt (b. 1949)
 George Emlen Roosevelt III (b. 1951)
 Robin Addison Roosevelt (1954–1999)

After their divorce in 1955, she married later that same year to Eric Ridder (1918–1996), the publisher of The Journal of Commerce, who also won the Gold medal in sailing with Julian in 1952.  Roosevelt married second to Margaret Fay Schantz, who was also divorced, from Donald William Scholle, in 1957. She was the daughter of Dr. Charles W. Schantz and was an alumna of the Masters School in Dobbs Ferry, New York. Together, they had:

 Fay Satterfield Roosevelt (b. 1959), who married Julian Potter Fisher II, in 1985.

In March 1957, his mansion on Center Island on Long Island, New York was ruined by a fire.

Roosevelt died of liver cancer on March 27, 1986, at Glen Cove Hospital in Manhasset, New York, not far from his home in Oyster Bay.

References

External links
 
 

1924 births
1986 deaths
American people of Dutch descent
Kean family
Julian Roosevelt
Schuyler family
American bankers
Businesspeople from New York City
Harvard Crimson rowers
American male sailors (sport)
Sailors at the 1948 Summer Olympics – Dragon
Sailors at the 1952 Summer Olympics – 6 Metre
Olympic gold medalists for the United States in sailing
20th-century American businesspeople
20th-century American politicians
Medalists at the 1952 Summer Olympics
United States Coast Guard personnel of World War II
United States Army reservists